Allain Roland Roy (born February 6, 1970) is a Canadian former ice hockey goaltender.

Career 
Roy won a silver medal at the 1994 Winter Olympics. He went on to play professional roller hockey with the St. Louis Vipers in the RHI from 1994 to 1997.

Roy works as a player agent in St. Louis, Missouri.

Awards and honors

References

External links

Roy Sports Group

1970 births
Living people
Canadian expatriate ice hockey players in Austria
Canadian ice hockey goaltenders
Harvard Crimson men's ice hockey players
Ice hockey players at the 1994 Winter Olympics
Ice hockey people from New Brunswick
Jokerit players
Olympic ice hockey players of Canada
Olympic medalists in ice hockey
Olympic silver medalists for Canada
People from Campbellton, New Brunswick
Saginaw Wheels players
St. Louis Vipers players
Medalists at the 1994 Winter Olympics
Winnipeg Jets (1979–1996) draft picks
Canadian expatriate ice hockey players in Finland
NCAA men's ice hockey national champions
Canadian expatriate ice hockey players in the United States